Quentin Hugh Harris (born January 26, 1977) is an American football executive and former safety who is the vice president of player personnel for the Arizona Cardinals of the National Football League (NFL).

Harris played college football at Syracuse and was signed by the Arizona Cardinals as an undrafted free agent in 2002. In his six seasons in the NFL, Harris played for the Cardinals, New York Giants and Denver Broncos. Following the end of his playing career, Harris joined the Cardinals as a scout and has been a member of their personnel department since 2008.

Playing career

Arizona Cardinals
Harris was signed by the Arizona Cardinals on April 22, 2002.

New York Giants
He signed with the New York Giants in March 2006. He was released by the Giants on September 2, 2006.

Denver Broncos
He was signed by the Denver Broncos on November 21, 2006. He was released by the Broncos on August 28, 2007.

Executive career

Arizona Cardinals
On June 18, 2008, Harris was hired by the Arizona Cardinals as a scout. In May 2013, Harris was promoted to director of pro scouting. In 2019, Harris was promoted to director of player personnel.

On February 16, 2021, Harris was promoted to vice president of player personnel.

Personal life
Harris and his  wife, Tara, have three children: Aliyah, Amani, and Elijah.

References

External links
 Arizona Cardinals profile
 Just Sports Stats

1977 births
Living people
American football defensive backs
Arizona Cardinals players
Arizona Cardinals scouts
Denver Broncos players
Syracuse Orange football players
Sportspeople from Wilkes-Barre, Pennsylvania
Players of American football from Pennsylvania
African-American players of American football
Wyoming Seminary alumni
Arizona Cardinals executives
African-American sports executives and administrators
21st-century African-American sportspeople
20th-century African-American sportspeople